South Witham railway station was a station in South Witham, Lincolnshire on the Midland Railway. It was Midland Railway property but train services were operated by the Midland and Great Northern Joint Railway. It was closed in 1959 along with most of the M&GN.

The station consisted of wooden buildings and platforms on the embankment, with a goods yard to the north, which could hold 50 wagons. It was built by a Mr. C. Barnes of Melton Mowbray, similar in style to Edmondthorpe and Wymondham. The platforms had a length of 400 ft (122 m), the passing loop was 279 ft (85 m) long.

References

External links
 

Disused railway stations in Lincolnshire
Former Midland Railway stations
Railway stations in Great Britain opened in 1894
Railway stations in Great Britain closed in 1959